APFTU may refer to:

 All Pakistan Federation of Trade Unions
 Andhra Pradesh Federation of Trade Unions in India
 A Place for the Unwilling, a videogame